†Incerticyclus cinereus was a species of tropical land snail with gills and an operculum, a terrestrial gastropod mollusk in the family Neocyclotidae.

This species was endemic to Martinique. It is now extinct.

References

Neocyclotidae
Extinct gastropods
Taxonomy articles created by Polbot